Who Killed Bruce Lee is an alternative Lebanese Rock band currently based in Germany. The band was formed in Lebanon in September 2009 and is made up of Wassim Bou Malham, Hassib Dergham, Pascal Sarkis and Malek Rizkallah.

History

Formation and early years
Starting the last few years of the 90s, having met around Malek's father's Quadrangle pub in Hazmieh, Lebanon, the four young friends used to jam together with the old Monday Blues Band.

The musicians that would join to make up Who Killed Bruce Lee used to play in various bands until they came together in 2009. They started off playing covers of LCD Sound System, the Strokes and Queens of the Stone Age, before starting to work on their own original material, releasing their first 5-song EP in 2012.

Their energetic sets and sold-out events have led them to co-headline the first Red Bull Soundclash of the Middle-East, a massive musical face-off between them and internationally acclaimed Lebanese band Mashrou' Leila. The event's producer David Gappa, former H-Blockx singer was impressed with WKBL's energy and originality, and promised to share their music with his peers upon his return to Germany.

In 2013, the band released the first single off their upcoming album, "Room for Three", inducing a heavier sound, with heart-wrenching guitars and synths, adding to the already dancy groove that has been their staple.

Paris, backstage talks
In October 2014, the band was invited to start work on writing and recording their upcoming album at Red Bull Studios in Paris. Working with the studio's technicians, the band's producer, Fadi Tabbal (of Tunefork Studios) and David Shaw (RBMA) hope to pack up a couple of fresh tracks for an exciting upcoming vinyl release. The band concluded their French tour with a sold-out gig at La Boule Noire on October 31, 2014.

The band decided to invite David Gappa who in turn invited Deville Schober, head of Brainstorm Music Marketing from Germany. Deville was so excited about the band's performance and crowd interaction that he instantly went backstage after the gig and proposed to the four men a management contract, promising them a 3-year artist development strategy starting from Germany. The paperwork did take a while to finally go through, due to the fact that WKBL have four Lebanese passports and all the complications that come with that, but in September 2015, after opening in Byblos Festival for Alt-J, WKBL flew straight to Berlin to record their full-length album.

Germany, Album Recording, European Tour
At Riverside Studios with acclaimed producer Victor Van Vugt (Depeche Mode, Nick Cave, Kylie Minogue...) the band produced their 11-track record Distant Rendezvous and kicked off their 100-concert 2016 album tour in Germany, Austria and Switzerland. Their gig at the Crossroads Rock Festival in October 2016 was filmed by WDR Rockpalast in full length and broadcast on German national TV ARD in January 2017.

Discography

Albums
 'Who Killed Bruce Lee' - Self-titled EP, 5 tracks - December 2012
 'Distant Rendezvous' - 11 tracks - February 2016

Singles
2014: "Room For Three"
2015: "Elvis"
2015: "Gypsy King"
2016: "Born Addicted"

External links

References

Lebanese rock music groups
Alternative rock groups